These quarterbacks have started at least one game for the Buffalo Bills of the National Football League. The Bills are a professional American football franchise based in the Buffalo–Niagara Falls metropolitan area. The team competes in the National Football League (NFL) as a member club of the American Football Conference (AFC) East division. The quarterbacks are listed in order of the date of each player's first start for the team at that position.

Starting quarterbacks

The number of games they started during the season is listed to the right:

Regular season

Postseason

Statistics

Most games started
These quarterbacks have the most starts for the Bills in regular season games (through the 2022 NFL season).

Top ten passers in Bills history

This table lists the quarterbacks with the most passing yards while with the Bills 
(Stats updated through the 2022 NFL regular season)

 Source:

Notes

See also
 List of American Football League players
 Lists of NFL starting quarterbacks

References

 Buffalo Bills Franchise Encyclopedia

 

 
Buffalo Bills
quarterbacks